The Cal Poly Mustangs baseball team represents California Polytechnic State University, which is located in San Luis Obispo, California.  The Mustangs are an NCAA Division I college baseball program, and along with the other Cal Poly athletic teams with the exception of swimming, wrestling, indoor track and football, the baseball team competes in the Big West Conference.

The Cal Poly Mustangs play all home games on campus at Robin Baggett Stadium.  Under the direction of Head Coach Larry Lee, the Mustangs have played in three NCAA Tournaments—2009, 2013, and 2014—including hosting their first regional in 2014. The Mustangs also won their first Big West Conference title in 2014. Prior to Lee's arrival and Cal Poly's move to Division I in all sports, the Mustangs played in multiple Division II regionals.

Conference membership history 
1948-1994: CCAA
1995-1996: Western Athletic Conference
1997–present: Big West Conference

The Blue-Green Rivalry 

The main rival of the Cal Poly is UC Santa Barbara.  The rivalry is a part of the larger Blue–Green Rivalry, which encompasses all sports between the two schools.

Robin Baggett Stadium 

Robin Baggett Stadium is a baseball stadium on the Cal Poly campus in San Luis Obispo, California. It was opened on January 21, 2001, with a 6–5 victory over Stanford in 12 innings. After renovations and expansion in 2018, it now seats 3,138. A record attendance of 3,284 was set on May 6, 2005, during a game against Cal State Fullerton.

Head coaches (Division I era)

Year-by-year NCAA Division I results

NCAA Tournament History
The NCAA Division I baseball tournament started in 1947.
The format of the tournament has changed through the years.
Cal Poly began playing Division I baseball in 1995.

Awards and honors (Division I only)

All-Americans

Freshman All-Americans

Big West Field Player of the Year

Big West Coach of the Year

Taken from the 2019 Cal Poly baseball media guide. Updated August 17, 2019.

Mustangs in the Major Leagues

Taken from the 2019 Cal Poly baseball media guide. Updated August 17, 2019.

Cal Poly Baseball alumni in the Olympics 

  Jimmy Van Ostrand (Team Canada), 2008 Beijing
  Joey Wagman (Team Israel), 2020 Tokyo

Cal Poly Baseball in video games 
Cal Poly was featured as a playable team in EA's MVP '06: NCAA Baseball game for PlayStation 2 and Xbox.

See also
List of NCAA Division I baseball programs

References

External links